Hussainganj is a Community development block and a town in district of Siwan, in Bihar state of India. It is one out of 13 blocks of Siwan Subdivision. The headquarter of the block is at Hussainganj town.

The block is divided into many Gram Panchayats and villages.

Gram Panchayats
Gram panchayats of Hussainganj block in Siwan Subdivision, Siwan district.

Badram
Baghauni
Chanp
Chapia bujurg
Chhata
Gopalpur
Habib nagar
Hathaura
Khanpur khairati
Kharsanda
Machakana
Markan
Pakwaliya
Paschimi harihans
Purvi harihans
Sidhwal

See also
Administration in Bihar

References

Community development blocks in Siwan district